Hoya pubicalyx is a species of flowering plant in the genus Hoya native to the Philippines. Sometimes confused for Hoya carnosa, it has succulent, lanceolate foliage and grows in a vining habit epiphytically. Kept as a houseplant in temperate climates, it can be found in variegated forms in nurseries. The Philippine five-centavo coin of the New Generation Currency Series features the flowers of this plant.

References

pubicalyx
                  
Endemic flora of the Philippines
pubicalyx
Plants described in 1918